Pushpa Impossible is an Indian television drama series produced by Jamnadas Majethia under Hats Off Productions. The series stars Karuna Pandey Vaidya in the titular role and premiered on 6 June 2022 on Sony SAB and digitally streams on SonyLIV.

Plot
Pushpa Randeriya Patel, a 45-year-old woman from Patan, lives in the Bapodra Chawl of Mumbai with her children: Ashwin, an employee; Chirag, a college student; and Rashi, a tenth grade student at Nirmala Nanavati School. She and her children moved to Mumbai after  her husband, Dilip's death after he committed a fraud

Pushpa, who is a ninth grade pass out, decides to study again as her children always insult her for being illiterate. She manages to get admission in Nirmala Nanavati School as Rashi's classmate with her mentor Radha Tai, Dipti's support, Nirmala Nanavati School's trustee Ashutosh Nanavati, and 3 other teachers including Vikram Saran's veto vote. 

However problems arises when Narhari Bapodra, the Chawl owner, gives her notice to vacate her house as he found out that Chirag always steal his shirt from munna's shop. Meanwhile, Rashi gets trapped under influence of her schoolmate Aaryan, which makes the Patels suspicious that Rashi is hiding something from them unknown from the fact that Aaryan bets upon weird challenges and this time he did same over Rashi. Pushpa challenges Narhari in High Court but loses the case. However, the most reputed lawyer of Mumbai Advocate Damini Mehra comes to her rescue. During the trial, Narhari and his lawyer are found guilty of many fraud charges and are arrested. However, to save Sushila and Prarthana from public humiliation for Narhari's misdeeds, Pushpa bails him out but with a warning to never trouble any other tenant residing in his Chawls. Pramod Bharadwaj falsely accused Ashwin for offering bribe to a government officer, then Ashwin and Deepti got suspended from office, later they exposed Pramod and Pramod got suspended and Ashwin and Deepti got promoted.

Later Pramod Bharadwaj vows to take revenge of his son's suspension from school and his expulsion from job publishes an article regarding Pushpa's admission at this age an illegal offence. Resulting in parents demanding her rustication. However parents realized their mistake after Pushpa saved some children who fainted due to food poisoning after having lunch from school canteen. 

The school trustees give Pushpa a final opportunity to permanently fix her place in the school if she pasess her Quarterly Unit Test, Pushpa works day and night to succeed but in vain as she fails in 3 out of 7 subjects and is ordered to leave the school much to the shock and dismay of Mr. Nanavati and Saran Sir. Pushpa bids a tearful goodbye accepting she has failed but believes that she is not defeated yet and this is not the dead-end of her life and strives to return. Then a miracle happens when Mr Nanavati gets a call from Canada for his concept of admitting Pushpa ji in school at this age They want to give school a grant of 25k dollars and want Mr nanavati and Mrs Patel to came and receive grant in Canada. 

Radha Kaku is found at a old age home after Pranav and Varsha show their true colors and transfers the house in their name and sells it to Bapodra who is unaware of this. Pranav and Varsha are found after Bapodra wants to meet them. They are arrested and Radha disowns Pranav. 

Meanwhile Dilip who was assumed as dead, returns as businessman Dharam Raidhan who is also the father of Ashwin's boss Manasi Raidhan. Dharam rushes to India after finding out that Manasi was presumed kidnapped. As soon as he reaches India, he meets with an accident planned by Jogi Dayal, who had helped Dilip to go to Dubai. Jogi then tries to kill Dilip in the hospital but is arrested by DCP Tejaswi Deshpande. She then finds out about how 17 years ago a collapse had happened and Dilip was convicted for it but somehow a fire broke out and Dilip was presumed dead. Dilip recovers and DCP wants conduct a DNA test but Dharam bribed the doctor and result was negative. Dilip's second wife Vasundhara Raidhan comes to India and is aware of Dilip's DNA test being positive. It also revealed that Manasi is Dilip's stepdaughter and is from Vasundhara's first marriage with Shekhar who cheated on her which led to Vasundhara divorcing him. Dilip then proposed to her for marriage and they both got married.

More drama leads to Dharam being revealed as Dilip in front of the entire world and gets arrested.

Now Dilip in jail . Pushpa is now relaxed but also worried about her daughter Rashi and son Chirag .As she hides the truth of Dilip from her children's but now her cards are open.Rashi is extremely upset after being know that her father is alive and Pushpa hides the truth from her. Dharam raidhan in jail wants bail . So he told  Vasundhra to arrange a lawyer of a high level for his bail.

Cast

Main
Karuna Pandey Vaidya as Pushpa Randeriya Patel – Kanjibhai and Phoolwati's daughter; Dilip's former wife; Ashwin, Chirag, and Rashi's mother. (2022–present)
 Snigdha Suman as Child Pushpa (2022-present) 
Naveen Pandita as Ashwin Patel – Pushpa and Dilip's elder son; Chirag and Rashi's brother; Deepti's husband. (2022–present)  
 Abhay Pratap Yadav as Child Ashwin (2022)
Darshan Gurjar as Chirag Patel – Pushpa and Dilip's younger son; Ashwin and Rashi's brother; Prathana's love interest and business partner. (2022–present) 
 Riyansh Ayer as Child Chirag (2022)
Deshna Dugad as Rashi Patel – Pushpa and Dilip's daughter; Ashwin and Chirag's sister  (2022–present)
Garima Parihar as Deepti "Deepu" Patel (nee: Parikh)– Sonal and Manish's daughter; Ashwin's wife. (2022–present)

Recurring
Sarita Joshi as Radha Kulkarni Limaye – Lakshman's daughter; Vinayak's widow; Pranav's mother; Pushpa's mentor and mother-figure. (2022–present)
Bhakti Rathod as Sonal Parikh – Manish's wife; Deepti's mother.  (2022–present)
Sachin Parikh as Manish Parikh – Kunjbala's son; Sonal's husband; Deepti's father. (2022–present)
Jayesh More as Dilip Patel – Pushpa's former husband; Vasundhara's husband; Ashwin, Chirag and Rashi's father; Manasi's step-father. (2022–present)
Aditi Bhagat as Manasi Raidhan – A stubborn and ambitious businesswoman; Shekhar and Vasundhara's daughter; Dilip's step-daughter (2022–present)
 Deepali Pansare as Vasundhara Raidhan – Shekhar's former wife; Dilip's wife; Manasi's mother (2023-present)
Ketki Dave as Kunjbala Parikh – Manish's mother; Deepti's grandmother. (2022)
Jagat Rawat as Ashutosh Nanavati – Founder and Trustee at Nirmala Nanavati School; Pushpa's mentor. (2022–present)
Adish Vaidya as Vikram Saran – Teacher at Nirmala Nanavati School. (2022–present)
Jayesh Barbhaya as Narhari Bapodra – Owner of Bapodra Chawl; Bharat's brother; Sushila's husband; Prarthana's father; Sunny's uncle. (2022–present)
Tulika Patel as Sushila Bapodra – Narhari's wife; Prarthana's mother; Sunny's aunt; Pushpa's friend (2022–present)
Indraxi Kanjilal as Prarthana "Pannu" Bapodra – Narhari and Sushila's daughter; Sunny's cousin; Chirag's love interest turned business partner. (2022–present)
Saud Mansuri as Aaryan Bharadwaj – Pramod's son; Rashi's rival turned friend. (2022–present) 
Amish Tanna as Mahendra Thakkar – A local shopkeeper at Bapodra Chawl; Golu's father. (2022–present)
Hans Aslot as Golu Thakkar – Mahendra's son. (2022–present)
Mansi Jain as Asawari Joshi – Bhaskar's wife; Pushpa's teacher. (2022–present)
Vikram Mehta as Bhaskar Joshi – Shobha's son; Ashwin's best friend; Asawari's husband. (2022-present)
Sanat Vyas as Arvind – Pushpa's childhood teacher. (2022)
Chinmay Shivalkar as Munna Pandey – Chirag's best friend. (2022–present)
Dhruvansh Parmar as Parminder "Cheese" Singh – Rashi and Pushpa's classmate. (2022–present)
Divyam Dubey as Sameer aka Sam – Rashi and Pushpa's classmate. (2022–present)
Vrinda Duvani as Meghna – Rashi's friend. (2022–present)
Neelam Singh as Neelima – Household help at Bapodra Chawal; Ramesh's wife. (2022–present)
Kalpesh Chauhan as Adv. Kunal Asthana – Narhari's lawyer. (2022) 
Hemang K Palan as Jagdish – A local tailor. (2022)
Neha Dandale as DCP Tejaswi Deshpande (2022–2023)
 Manoj Gupta as Inspector Manoj - Chirag's friend (2022-present)

Guest
Mona Singh as Advocate Damini Mehra – Owner of Damini Mehra Associates; A social activist and reputed advocate of Mumbai; Shweta's mother; Pushpa's lawyer. (2022)
Milky Shrivastav as Shweta Mehra – Damini's daughter. (2022)
Urvashi Dholakia as Advocate Devi Singh Shekhawat – A criminal lawyer; Tejaswini's friend; Roshni's mother (2023)
Shatakshee Jain as Roshni Shekhawat – Devi's daughter. (2023)
Sumeet Raghvan as Rajesh Wagle from Wagle Ki Duniya – Nayi Peedhi Naye Kissey (2022)
Bharati Achrekar as Radhika Wagle from Wagle Ki Duniya – Nayi Peedhi Naye Kissey (2022)
Sheehan Kapahi as Atharva Wagle (2022/2023)

Production

Development
This show was officially announced in the 2nd week of May 2022 with the title Dil Hai Chhota Sa, Chhoti Si Aasha.

The shooting of the series began in the last week of March 2022.

The first Promo released on 25 March 2022 with the current title.

The second promo released featuring lead actress Karuna Pandey Vaidya as Pushpa Randeriya Patel launched on 9 Apr 2022.

The second promo was released again on 16 April 2022 but this time revealing the launch date and time.

Casting
Karuna Pandey Vaidya, Naveen Pandita, Deshna Dugad and Darshan Gurjar were cast in the leading characters of Pushpa Randeriya Patel, Ashwin Patel, Rashi Patel and Chirag Patel.

Crossover
A one-hour special crossover with Wagle Ki Duniya – Nayi Peedhi Naye Kissey from 12 September 2022 to 13 September 2022.

See also
List of programs broadcast by Sony SAB

References

External links 
 Production Website
 
 Pushpa Impossible on Sony SAB
 Pushpa Impossible on SonyLIV

2022 Indian television series debuts
Hindi-language television shows
Indian drama television series
Indian television soap operas
Sony SAB original programming
Hats Off Productions